The Congress of New Caledonia, a "territorial congress" (congrès territorial or congrès du territoire), is the legislature of New Caledonia. It has 54 members who serve five-year terms, selected proportionally based on the partisan makeup of all three assemblies of the provinces of New Caledonia with a 5% threshold. The congress is headquartered at 1 Boulevard Vauban in downtown Noumea. Local media in New Caledonia refer to the congress as "boulevard Vauban" when referencing it.

Results of parliamentary elections

May 2019 election results
The political parties, aside from naturally being split based on socioeconomic ideological differences, are split along hard-line stances on possible New Caledonian independence from France. Both independentists and its opponents subscribe to various socioeconomic ideologies so the difference of opinion is usually rooted in favouring either Kanak nationalism, New Caledonian separatism and independence as opposed to French nationalism and New Caledonian regionalism.

See also

List of presidents of the Congress of New Caledonia

External links
  

Legislatures of Overseas France
Politics of New Caledonia
Government of New Caledonia
New Caledonia